Rich G. Carter (born August 27, 1971, Dallas, Texas) is Professor of Chemistry of the Department of Chemistry at Oregon State University. His research fields are synthetic organic chemistry in general and natural product synthesis. He is also the co-founder and CEO of a chemical manufacturing company Valliscor.

Biography
Carter attended Gettysburg College for his undergraduate studies and the University of Texas at Austin for graduate school, earning his Ph.D. in 1997 under the tutelage of Professor Philip Magnus. He subsequently joined the laboratory of James D. White at OSU, as an NIH Postdoctoral Fellow. He was a faculty member at the University of Mississippi before relocating to Corvallis, Oregon in 2002.

External links
Carter Group at Oregon State University

References

1971 births
21st-century American chemists
Oregon State University faculty
University of Texas at Austin College of Natural Sciences alumni
People from Dallas
Living people
American company founders
American chief executives of manufacturing companies